DIX or Dix may refer to:

Computing 
 Danish Internet Exchange Point, in Copenhagen
 Data Integrity Extensions, data corruption error-handling field in data storage technology
 Device Independent X, part of the 2D graphics device driver in the X.Org Server
 DIX Ethernet, an Ethernet frame type

People

Surname 
Dix is a Jewish German originating in the Rhineland, Germany
 Adrian Dix (born 1964), Canadian politician
 Alan Dix, British author and university professor
 Bernard Dix (1925–1995), British trade unionist
 Beulah Marie Dix (1876–1970), American screenwriter, playwright and novelist
 Carl Dix (born 1948), American communist
 De'Audra Dix (born 1984), American football player
 Dorothea Dix (1802–1887), American social worker
 Dorothy Dix (1861–1951), American journalist
 Drew Dennis Dix (born 1944), US Army officer awarded the Medal of Honor
 Eddie Dix (born 1970), Dutch baseball player
 Edwin Asa Dix (1860–1911), AKA Edwin Augustus Dix, American author
 Emily Dix (1904–1972), Welsh palaeobotanist
 Eulabee Dix (1878–1961), American artist
 Frederick Dix (1883–966), British speed skater
 Gioele Dix (born 1956), Italian actor and comedian
 Gregory Dix (1902–1952), English priest and liturgical scholar
 Helena Dix (born 1979), Australian operatic soprano
 Jan Dix, German musician
 Joan Dix (1918–1991), English figure skater
 John Alden Dix (1860–1928), New York governor
 John Adams Dix (1798–1879), American Secretary of the Treasury, Governor of New York and Union major general during the Civil War
 John Ross Dix (1811-after 1863), British writer and poet in Great Britain and America
 Margaret Dix (1902–1991), British neuro-otologist
 Margaret A. Dix (born 1939), Jersey-born Guatemalan botanist
 Michèle Dix, British civil engineer
 Morgan Dix (1827–1908), American Episcopal priest and theologian
 Otto Dix (1891–1969), German expressionist
 Peter Dix (1953–1988), Irish sailor
 Richard Dix (1893–1949), American actor
 Richard Dix (footballer) (1924–1990), English footballer
 Robert Dix (1935–2018), American actor
 Ronnie Dix (1912–1998), English footballer
 Roscoe D. Dix (1839–1912), American politician and Michigan Auditor General
 Rose Ellen Dix, English YouTuber
 Shane Dix (born 1960), Australian writer
 Sophie Dix (born 1969), English actress
 Ute Dix (born 1955), German speed skater
 Walter Dix (born 1986), American track and field athlete
 William Dix (disambiguation), various people

Given name 
 Dix Terne, 1950s West German bobsledder

Places

Switzerland 
 Lac des Dix, the reservoir created by Grande Dixence Dam

United States 
 Dix, Illinois
 Dix, Nebraska
 Dix, New York
 Dix Hill, in Raleigh, North Carolina
 Dix Mountain, in the Adirondacks, New York
 Dix Range, in the Adirondacks, New York
 Dix River, in Kentucky
 Dix Dam
 Dix Stadium, in Kent, Ohio
 Fort Dix, an Army post in New Jersey

Other uses 
 D-IX, a drug cocktail developed in Germany during WW2 to relieve fatigue
 Dix (steamboat), a steamboat which ran on Puget Sound, USA from 1904 to 1906
 The Dix, a fictional R&B group
 Dix, a hymn tune used with hymn For the Beauty of the Earth and As with Gladness, Men of Old; named for William C. Dix
 DIX, the number 509 in Roman numerals

See also 
 Dicks (disambiguation)
 D9 (disambiguation), including a list of topics named D.IX, etc.